The men's light heavyweight event was part of the boxing programme at the 1992 Summer Olympics. The weight class allowed boxers of up to 81 kilograms to compete. The competition was held from 29 July to 9 August 1992. 26 boxers from 26 nations competed.

Medalists

Results
The following boxers took part in the event:

First round
 Stephen Wilson (GBR) – BYE
 Mika Masoe (ASA) – BYE
 Rostyslav Zaulychnyi (EUN) – BYE
 Jacklord Jacobs (NGA) – BYE
 Zoltán Béres (HUN) def. Paolo Mwaselle (TAN), 30:13
 Roland Raforme (SEY) def. Rick Temperi (AUS), 27:7
 Patrice Aouissi (FRA) def. Manuel Verde (MEX), RSCH-3 (01:46)
 Montell Griffin (USA) def. France Mabiletsa (BOT), 10:4
 Ko Yo-Da (KOR) def. Bai Chongguang (CHN), 18:4
 Robert Brown (CAN) def. Damidin Zul (MGL), RSCH-2 (03:00)
 Torsten May (GER) def. Kim Gil-Nam (PRK), 9:1
 Mohamed Benguesmia (ALG) def. Raimundo Yant (VEN), 15:11
 Wojciech Bartnik (POL) def. Alex González (PUR), 6:3
 Angel Espinosa (CUB) def. Mehmet Gürgen (TUR), RSC-3 (01:06)
 Roberto Castelli (ITA) def. Simon Maebele (CAM), WO
 Asghar Ali Changezi (PAK) def. Ali Kazemi (IRN), WO

Second round
 Stephen Wilson (GBR) def. Mika Masoe (ASA), 12:8
 Rostyslav Zaulychnyi (EUN) def. Jacklord Jacobs (NGA), 16:8
 Zoltán Béres (HUN) def. Asghar Ali Changezi (PAK), RSCH-1 (01:17)
 Roland Raforme (SEY) def. Patrice Aouissi (FRA), RSCH-2 (02:19)
 Montell Griffin (USA) def. Ko Yo-Da (KOR), 16:1
 Torsten May (GER) def. Robert Brown (CAN), 7:1
 Wojciech Bartnik (POL) def. Mohamed Benguesmia (ALG), 14:3
 Angel Espinosa (CUB) def. Roberto Castelli (ITA), RSCH-1 (02:34)

Quarterfinals
 Rostyslav Zaulychnyi (EUN) def. Stephen Wilson (GBR), 13:0
 Zoltán Béres (HUN) def. Roland Raforme (SEY), 11:3
 Torsten May (GER) def. Montell Griffin (USA), 6:4
 Wojciech Bartnik (POL) def. Angel Espinosa (CUB), 9:3

Semifinals
 Rostyslav Zaulychnyi (EUN) def. Zoltán Béres (HUN), RSC-3 (02:51)
 Torsten May (GER) def. Wojciech Bartnik (POL), 8:6

Final
 Torsten May (GER) def. Rostyslav Zaulychnyi (EUN), 8:3

References

Light Heavyweight